Oligonychus is a genus of mites in the family Tetranychidae, the spider mites. Many members of this genus are familiar pests of plants. There are about 200 described species.

Species include:

Oligonychus aceris (maple spider mite), a pest of maples
Oligonychus afrasiaticus (date palm spider mite), a major pest of the date palm in North Africa and the Middle East; also on grasses, including maize
Oligonychus araneum (grasswebbing mite)
Oligonychus bicolor (oak red mite), on oaks and other hardwood trees
Oligonychus biharensis (cassava red mite), many cultivated fruits and ornamental plants
Oligonychus coffeae (tea red spider mite), "considered to be the most serious pest of tea". Also a pest of coffee, cotton, and jute, and recorded on cashew, African oil palm, rubber, and several fruit crops
Oligonychus gossypii (cotton red mite), cotton, fruits, beans, ornamentals
Oligonychus ilicis (southern red mite, coffee red mite), a pest of many woody ornamentals, especially azaleas and camellias, first described from American holly (Ilex opaca)
Oligonychus indicus (sugarcane red spider mite, sugarcane leaf mite), banana and grass crops
Oligonychus litchii, grasses and palms
Oligonychus mangiferus (mango spider mite), many fruit crops, sweet potato, cotton, ornamentals
Oligonychus mcgregori, avocado, cassava, cotton, ornamentals
Oligonychus milleri (pine spider mite), known from many species of pine
Oligonychus oryzae (paddy leaf mite, rice leaf mite), a pest of rice
Oligonychus palus, banana
Oligonychus perditus, a pest of ornamental conifers, such as juniper bonsai
Oligonychus perseae (persea mite), a top pest of avocado in California, also on ornamentals
Oligonychus pratensis (Banks grass mite), corn, turfgrasses
Oligonychus punicae (ash flower gall mite, avocado brown mite), a pest of avocado
Oligonychus sacchari (sugarcane yellow mite), on sugarcane and other grasses
Oligonychus shinkajii, grass crops such as rice, sugarcane, and bamboo
Oligonychus thelytokus, some fruits, cassava, cotton, and ornamentals
Oligonychus ununguis (spruce spider mite), a pest of conifers with a preference for spruces
Oligonychus yothersi (avocado red mite), a pest of yerba mate and avocado
Oligonychus zeae (maize spider mite), banana and grasses

Gallery

References

Trombidiformes